Miloš Pavlović  (born April 12, 1984) is a former Serbian professional basketball player.

References

External links
 fiba.com
 

1984 births
Living people
Basketball League of Serbia players
Basketball players from Belgrade
OKK Beograd players
KK Beovuk 72 players
KK Borac Čačak players
KK FMP (1991–2011) players
KK Leotar players
BKK Radnički players
Serbian expatriate basketball people in Bosnia and Herzegovina
Serbian expatriate basketball people in Cyprus
Serbian expatriate basketball people in Greece
Serbian expatriate basketball people in France
Serbian expatriate basketball people in Romania
Serbian expatriate basketball people in North Macedonia
Serbian expatriate basketball people in Ukraine
Serbian men's basketball players
Power forwards (basketball)